Sperm acrosome membrane-associated protein 3 is a protein that in humans is encoded by the SPACA3 gene. It may be involved in adhesion to the egg before the egg is fertilized.

References

Further reading